Apheloria virginiensis, the Kentucky flat millipede, is a large North American millipede. It is reported to secrete cyanide compounds as a defense.  It is recommended that one wash hands after handling this organism as the toxic compounds it secretes are poisonous and can cause extreme irritation if rubbed in the eyes.

Apheloria virginiensis serves as a host to the parasitic fungus Arthrophaga myriapodina, which causes infected individuals to climb to an elevated spot before death.

References

External links

Images of Apheloria virginiensis  - BugGuide

Polydesmida
Millipedes of North America
Animals described in 1770
Taxa named by Dru Drury